Francisco "Fran" Pastor Bautista (born 6 January 1994) is a Spanish footballer who plays for Bolivian club The Strongest as a right winger.

Club career
Born in Alcalá de Henares, Pastor graduated from the youth academy of Real Madrid and was promoted to the C-team in early 2013. In August of the same year, he was loaned out to Segunda División B side SD Compostela.  On 2 September 2014, he joined Club Marino de Luanco in the same tier on loan. On 20 September, he scored twice in a 2–2 draw against Atlético Astorga FC.

On 28 January 2015, Pastor signed with CD Guijuelo until the end of the season. In the following years, he went on to represent UD Almería B, UD Logroñés, CD Vitoria and UD San Sebastián de los Reyes in the same tier and moved to Tercera División with RSD Alcalá in September 2019.

On 11 January 2020, Pastor moved abroad and joined Bolivian side Club Real Potosí.

After one season on Real Potosí, on 4 January 2021 Paston joined to The Strongest, also in Bolivia.

References

External links

1994 births
Living people
Spanish footballers
Footballers from the Community of Madrid
Association football wingers
Segunda División B players
Tercera División players
Real Madrid C footballers
SD Compostela footballers
Marino de Luanco footballers
CD Guijuelo footballers
UD Almería B players
UD Logroñés players
CD Vitoria footballers
UD San Sebastián de los Reyes players
RSD Alcalá players
Bolivian Primera División players
Club Real Potosí players
The Strongest players
Spanish expatriate footballers
Spanish expatriate sportspeople in Bolivia
Expatriate footballers in Bolivia